Anjilavand-e Olya (also Romanized as Anjīlāvand-e ‘Olyā; also known as Anjīlāvand, Anjīlāvand-e Bālā, Anjīlāvand-e Kohneh, Anjīlāvand Khūneh, and Anjīlāvand Kūhneh) is a village in Taraznahid Rural District, in the Central District of Saveh County, Markazi Province, Iran. At the 2006 census, its population was 126, in 39 families.

References 

Populated places in Saveh County